Corneola is a genus of medium-sized, air-breathing land snails, terrestrial pulmonate gastropod mollusks in the family Helicidae, the true snails.

Species 
Species within the genus Corneola include:
 Corneola acrotricha (P. Fischer, 1877)
 Corneola crombezi (Locard, 1882)
 Corneola desmoulinsii (Farines, 1834)
 Corneola squamatina (Rossmässler, 1835)

References 

 Groenenberg D.S.J., Subai P. & Gittenberger E. (2016). Systematics of Ariantinae (Gastropoda, Pulmonata, Helicidae), a new approach to an old problem. Contributions to Zoology. 85(1): 37-65

External links
 Held, F. (1837-1838). Notizen über die Weichthiere Bayerns. Isis (Oken), 30 (4): 303-309 (1837); 30 (12): 901-919 (1838). Leipzig

Helicidae
Gastropod genera
Taxonomy articles created by Polbot